Nelson Delailomaloma is a Fijian politician, who served as Minister for Education in the interim Cabinet formed by Laisenia Qarase in the wake of the Fiji coup of 2000.  He held office till an elected government took power in September 2001.

References

Fijian politicians
Living people
Education ministers of Fiji
I-Taukei Fijian people
Year of birth missing (living people)